Bestime (also spelled BeStime or Bes-time) was a British manufacturer of jigsaw puzzles and games. In the 1950s and 1960s, the company was best known for its jigsaws created by  Enid Blyton. The company made the first four puzzles in 1948, including an Amelia Jane jigsaw (the first jigsaw) and released over 20. The Famous Five series of jigsaws were illustrated by Eileen Soper. Harmsen van der Beek was the illustrator for the Noddy series of jigsaws as with the books. Bestime also made the Blyton Giant Tiddley Winks Game. In 1954, Bestime released the first four jigsaws of The Secret Seven. The company was dissolved in 1973.

References

Toy companies of the United Kingdom
Board game publishing companies
Jigsaw puzzle manufacturers
Defunct manufacturing companies of England
Enid Blyton
Manufacturing companies established in 1948
Manufacturing companies disestablished in 1973
1948 establishments in England
1973 disestablishments in England